Luis Ángel González Macchi (born December 13, 1947, in Asunción) was the President of Paraguay from 1999 until 2003.

Career 
He was the President of the Paraguayan Senate from 1998 to 1999.
As the president of the Senate, González Macchi was next in line for the presidency on March 23, 1999 following the assassination of Vice President Luis María Argaña.  President Raúl Cubas was suspected of being involved in the assassination. This, combined with other scandals resulted in his impeachment by the Chamber of Deputies on March 24.  Realizing that he faced almost certain conviction and removal by the Senate, Cubas resigned on March 29, and González Macchi ascended to the presidency.

As president, González Macchi attempted to create a coalition government to spur cooperation within Paraguay and repair the economy which had been damaged by the political crisis. This coalition did not last long, as the Authentic Radical Liberal Party left it in 2000, leaving González Macchi without a majority in the legislature. González Macchi became ever more unpopular as the economy sagged further and found passing legislation difficult because few legislators would vote on bills that he pushed for. There was a coup attempt in 2000 and an impeachment attempt in 2001, though both failed. González Macchi was able to hold on to his presidency until the elections of 2003, which Nicanor Duarte won. He could not run for a full term in this election, as the Constitution bars any sort of reelection for a president even if he serves a partial term. He left office on August 15, 2003.

On December 4, 2006, González Macchi was sentenced to eight years in prison for fraud and embezzlement. The sentence was appealed.

References

External links
 Biography by CIDOB

1947 births
Living people
People from Asunción
Presidents of Paraguay
Paraguayan people of Italian descent
Paraguayan people of Spanish descent
Paraguayan prisoners and detainees
Prisoners and detainees of Paraguay
Members of the Chamber of Deputies of Paraguay
Presidents of the Senate of Paraguay
Colorado Party (Paraguay) politicians
20th-century Paraguayan lawyers
Universidad Nacional de Asunción alumni
Paraguayan politicians convicted of crimes
Heads of government who were later imprisoned
Recipients of the Medal of the Oriental Republic of Uruguay